Mix & Match is the debut extended play of South Korean girl group Loona Odd Eye Circle, a sub-unit of Loona. It was released on September 21, 2017, by Blockberry Creative. The album consists of five tracks, including the title track, "Girl Front".

Promotion and release
The group began teasing the album on September 9, 2017, by releasing photos of the group and individual shots of the members for the following 4 days. The album details were released on September 14, 2017, along with a confirmation of the release date and the track listing. This was followed by more teaser images, and previews of the music video and album songs on September 18 and 19 respectively through the group's official YouTube channel.

The album was released on September 21, 2017, as well as the official music video for "Girl Front", at 14:00 KST. This is also when the unit began promoting on various music shows.

Track listing

Charts

Mix & Match

Max & Match

References

External links
 Mix & Match at Vlending Co., Ltd.
 Mix & Match at Windmill ENT

2017 debut EPs
Korean-language EPs
Loona (group) EPs